Sanford Emory Stephens II (September 21, 1940 – June 6, 2000) was an American college football player and civic leader.  Stephens was born and raised in the Pittsburgh area city of Uniontown, Pennsylvania and is best known for his career as a college football quarterback at the University of Minnesota, where he became one of the first African-American quarterbacks in major college football and the first African American to be named an All-American at quarterback.  He was a member of Alpha Phi Alpha fraternity.

College career
Stephens was the first black man to play quarterback at the University of Minnesota and remains the only quarterback to take the Gophers to the Rose Bowl (1961 and 1962). He was one of the first "National Recruits" for the University of Minnesota, along with Judge Dickson and Bill Munsey. The mayor of McKeesport, Pennsylvania, had served in the Navy with John Mariucci, the coach of the Gopher Hockey team. Mariucci tipped off the University of Minnesota football coach, Murray Warmath about the players.

In 1960, along with Uniontown (PA) High School teammate Bill Munsey, Stephens led the University of Minnesota to an 8-1 regular season record and the national championship. Minnesota defeated the Iowa Hawkeyes 27-10 when both teams were undefeated, one of biggest games in the Iowa–Minnesota football rivalry. Stephens became the first African-American major-college All-American quarterback and finished fourth in the Heisman Trophy balloting.  In 1961, Stephens received the Chicago Tribune Silver Football as the Most Valuable Player of the Big Ten Conference.

Sandy Stephens was a member of The Pigskin Club of Washington, D.C. National Intercollegiate All-American Football Players Honor Roll.

Professional career
Stephens was a second-round NFL draft choice of the Cleveland Browns and the fifth overall selection in the AFL draft by the New York Titans.  Both teams said that they wouldn’t use him as a quarterback and he never played a down in either league.  The Canadian Football League (CFL) welcomed him as a quarterback, as the Montreal Alouettes offered a reported $25,000 signing bonus and a three-year contract at $30,000 per year.

After playing for the Alouettes in 1962, he was cut by Montreal during the 1963 season and was claimed on waivers by the Toronto Argonauts.  Upon leaving the CFL, Stephens tried out as a walk-on with the Minnesota Vikings. In his CFL career, he threw 22 touchdowns with 38 interceptions on 2,823 yards, while rushing for 487 yards on 88 carries and 8 touchdowns. He also caught 12 passes for 192 yards and a touchdown. He was also used as an occasional kicker, making 12 out of 19 extra points and 4 out of 8 field goals, with three punts for a 20-yard average. On September 20, 1964, he was involved in a near fatal accident. The car is which he was riding with Ted Dean, a Minnesota Vikings player, struck a tree in South Minneapolis. Two years after the accident Stephens signed with the Kansas City Chiefs as a fullback. He was willing to play any of the back positions and continued to dream of playing as a quarterback in the NFL, but to no avail. He ended his active football career in 1968.

Death
Stephens was found dead at his Bloomington, Minnesota apartment by a relative. His death at age 59 was attributed to a heart attack.

Legacy
Thirty years after he left football, Stephens was named to the University of Minnesota All Century Team, the Star Tribune 100 All-Century Top Sports Figures (No. 30), and awarded NCAA Legends status. He was inducted into the University of Minnesota Sports Hall of Fame, the Western Pennsylvania All Sports Hall of Fame and he was nominated for induction into the National and College Football Foundation Hall of Fame. One of his most coveted recognitions was his induction into the Rose Bowl Hall of Fame in 1997. On May 17, 2011, Stephens was voted into the College Football Hall of Fame as part of the 16-member Class of 2011. He is the 22nd Gopher to be elected into the College Football Hall of Fame and the fourth from the 1960 National Championship team.

References

External links
 Just Sports Stats
 AAregistry.com article on Stephens
 Post-Gazette article on Stephens
 

1940 births
2000 deaths
All-American college football players
People from Uniontown, Pennsylvania
American football quarterbacks
American players of Canadian football
Canadian football quarterbacks
Minnesota Golden Gophers football players
Montreal Alouettes players
Toronto Argonauts players
Players of American football from Pennsylvania
Sportspeople from the Pittsburgh metropolitan area
College Football Hall of Fame inductees